Khanlar Hajiyev (9 September 1956) is an Azerbaijan judge, and former Judge of the European Court of Human Rights in respect of Azerbaijan.

Education
 2001 Doctor of Law
 Postgraduate training in Epidemiological Surveillance and Diseases Management
 1983 Postgraduate course at the Faculty of Law of Moscow State University
 Moscow Institute of State and Law of the Academy of Science, Institute of Philosophy and Law of the Academy of Science of Azerbaijan

Career
 Judge of the European Court of Human Rights nominated from Azerbaijan elected in 2003-2017
 1998-2003 Chairman of the Constitutional Court of Azerbaijan 
 1993-1998 Chairman of the Supreme Court of Azerbaijan 
 1996-2001 Full-fledged member of the European Commission for Democracy through Law of the Council of Europe (Venice Commission) 
 1992-1993 First Vice-President of the Supreme Court of Azerbaijan
 1993-2001 Lecturer at the Baku State University on the Legal Aspects of the Struggle against International Criminality
 1988-1990 Senior Adviser at the Supreme Court of USSR
1985-1988 Editor of the Penal Law and Penal Procedure Department of the Soviet Justice Journal 
 1983-1985 Adviser of the Supreme Court of USSR

Selected works

Books
 The Interpretation of the Provisions of Constitution and Law by Constitutional Courts -Author: Khanlar Hajiyev -Publisher: Baku : Ozan, 2002

See also
List of judges of the European Court of Human Rights

References

1956 births
Living people
Jurists from Ganja, Azerbaijan
Azerbaijani judges
Judges of the European Court of Human Rights
Azerbaijani judges of international courts and tribunals